Pedro Victor Calil Sandoval (born 21 March 1993), known simply as Pedro Victor, is a Brazilian footballer who plays as a centre-back.

References

External links
 

1993 births
Living people
Brazilian footballers
Association football defenders
Brazilian expatriate footballers
Expatriate footballers in Malaysia
Brazilian expatriate sportspeople in Estonia
Expatriate footballers in Estonia
Malaysia Super League players
PKNP FC players